Spiramide (developmental code name AMI-193) is an experimental antipsychotic that acts as a selective 5-HT2A, 5-HT1A, and D2 receptor antagonist. It has negligible affinity for the 5-HT2C receptor.

References 

Butyrophenone antipsychotics
Fluoroarenes
Lactams
Nitrogen heterocycles
Phenol ethers
Spiro compounds